The 2020 TCR Australia Touring Car Series (known for sponsorship reasons as the 2020 Carsales TCR Australia Touring Car Series season) was to be the second season of the TCR Australia Touring Car Series. The series was set be run as part of the renamed Motorsport Australia Championships series. The rescheduled season-opener was due to be held in Sydney Motorsport Park and it was cancelled due to COVID-19 pandemic.

Teams and drivers
The following teams and drivers were under contract to compete in the 2020 championship:

Summary
 Ashley Seward Motorsport will expand to enter three cars. The team had entered a single car throughout the 2019 championship before entering a second car at the final event. Australian Formula Ford driver Jay Hanson will make his début in the series with the team.
 Reigning Hyundai Excel Cup—a series run as part of the Shannons Nationals competition—champion Michael Clemente will make his series début after purchasing a Honda Civic Type R used by Wall Racing in 2019. Clemente's team will compete under the name Michael Clemente Motorsport.
 Garry Rogers Motorsport will expand from a three-car entry to a six-car entry. The team will add one Renault Mégane R.S at selected events to their two full season entries from 2019, one of which will be driven by James Moffat; and a second Alfa Romeo Giulietta Veloce alongside the single entry from the previous season, with Michael Caruso and Jordan Cox driving them. The team will also run two Peugeot 308 cars under the GRM Customer Racing banner for New Zealand Touring Cars champion and former Supercars driver Jason Bargwanna, who will make his series début, and Aaron Cameron, coming from Melbourne Performance Center. A third Peugeot will be entered by the team at the TCR Asia Pacific Cup for 2019 TCR BeNeLux Touring Car champion Julien Briché.
 Australian Formula Ford driver Zac Soutar will make his series début with the family-run Team Soutar Motorsport. The team will enter the Honda Civic Type R used by Tony D'Alberto in 2019.
 Production Touring Car driver Michael King will make his series début in a new Hyundai i30 N run by DashSport.
Kelly Racing, who ran Subaru WRX STI and Holden Astra cars during the 2019 season, withdrew from the championship to focus on their Supercars team following their switch to Ford cars.
 Toyota 86 Champion Jack Milligan and Stan van Oord will make their series début with Track Tec Racing. They will drive a pair of Audi RS 3 LMS.
Wall Racing will enter three Honda Civic Type R cars retaining John Martin and Tony D'Alberto with Paul Ip joining the team. In addition to the three full season entries, the team will enter a fourth Civic for Münnich Motorsport founder and 2019 TCR Middle East Series champion René Münnich at the TCR Asia Pacific Cup.
 Chelsea Angelo will drive for Melbourne Performance Centre driving a Volkswagen Golf GTI.
 Declan Fraser will make their series début with Milldun Motorsport driving a Volkswagen Golf GTI.
 Bradley Shiels will make his series début in a  Hyundai i30 N run by Tilton Racing.

Race calendar 
The calendar was announced in October 2019 with seven confirmed rounds, plus two non-championship rounds. The final calendar was published in January 2020. A revised calendar, expanding into 2021 was released on 26 May 2020.

Calendar changes

 The championship will visit the Mount Panorama Circuit for the first time, originally having been planned to occur as part of the Bathurst 6 Hour weekend over Easter. Due to the cancellation of the Easter event, the round was rescheduled to the date originally planned to hold the non-championship Bathurst International event.
 The Bend Motorsport Park was originally scheduled to only host one event rather than two as in 2019, while Queensland Raceway was also not listed on the initially released calendar. Neither circuit appeared on the revised calendar.
 Morgan Park Raceway was intended to host a round of the championship, marking its first competitive event since 2011. However, it also did not appear on the revised calendar.
 In addition to the seven championship rounds originally scheduled, there were originally also planned to be two associated events; a round supporting the Australian Grand Prix weekend was intended to be held as the TCR Asia Pacific Cup, along with an endurance race at Mount Panorama late in the year. Both of these rounds were to be non-championship events. The TCR Asia-Pacific Cup event was cancelled after qualifying was held, due to its status as a support event to the Australian Grand Prix, which was cancelled on the Friday morning. The Bathurst International endurance race was also cancelled, as it had been intended to draw international entries alongside the local teams; the event slot is to be used instead to host the rescheduled championship round, along with a rescheduled Bathurst 6 Hour.
 The impacts of the COVID-19 pandemic forced a major reschedule before the first championship round took place. All events barring the Sandown round were rescheduled, with an intended March start being pushed to August, and the extension of the season into the 2021 calendar year. Apart from the above-mentioned circuits which were not on the rescheduled calendar, Winton Motor Raceway was also removed from the schedule, while two Tasmanian circuits, Symmons Plains Raceway and Baskerville Raceway were added.

Rule changes 

 The 2020 season champion will drive in either the World Touring Car Cup or an International TCR race as a wildcard entry as a prize.
 The winner of the Michelin Rookie of the Year will be awarded a test day with a European TCR team.
 Another new class will also be introduced—the Panta Cup, named after the series' fuel supplier, Panta Fuels—in which six semi-professional and amateur drivers will be eligible for. The winner of the Panta Cup will get a drive in an International TCR Endurance race.

Notes

References

External links 
Official website

TCR Australia
Australia
TCR Australia Touring Car Series